Clatworthy is a surname. Notable people with the surname include:

Menna Clatworthy, British immunologist
Fred Payne Clatworthy (1875–1953), American photographer
Jodie Clatworthy (born 1972), Australian swimmer
Robert Clatworthy (art director) (1911–1992), American art director
Robert Clatworthy (sculptor) (1928–2015), British sculptor
W. H. Clatworthy (1915–2010), American mathematician